This article exists to give readers an insight into electrical wiring in Hong Kong.

Overview
BS 1363 is the mainstream wiring system in Hong Kong. In old buildings, the BS 546 system is also common.

Due to its proximity to mainland China, electrical products from there are present in Hong Kong, especially those as a result of cross-border purchase carried out by mainland Chinese immigrants. Nevertheless, even if the product meets the safety requirements in China, they are not necessarily confirmed to BS 1363 standard, thus may have plug and socket compatibility issues when using them in Hong Kong.

Before the enforcement of the Electrical Products (Safety) Regulation, many types of plugs could be found in Hong Kong. Using this old equipment sometimes leads to plug and socket mating problems. Nowadays, virtually all plugs fitted in equipment sold in Hong Kong are BS 1363 compatible.

Many overseas citizens who bring equipment in from their home countries do not use the British wiring system. Citizens from the United Kingdom and countries that use British wiring systems normally do not encounter plug-and-socket issues in Hong Kong.

Case specific analysis

Mainland China two-pin plugs
The 2-pin plugs (with round or flat pins) in mainland China are compatible with the British converter plugs sold in Hong Kong. For shavers and electric toothbrushes that take less than 1A of current, British shaver adaptors can be also used.

Mainland China three-pin plugs
Mainland China three-pin plugs cannot be converted with a British standard adaptors, which are commonly sold in Hong Kong. One can replace the plug or the power cord as appropriate. This is also the case for Australian three-pin plugs.

Schuko

Special attention is to be paid to the earthing of Schuko plugs. Though British converter plugs for Schuko are occasionally found; they are not common. Plug replacement is often necessary. This problem is common for special equipment in optical shops and among the residents of European origin.

Old plugs
There are old electrical plugs that can be inserted into the British sockets BS 1363 or BS 546, but they do not meet the British Standards. Standards "BS 1363" or "BS546" are not marked on such old quasi-UK plugs. Some of them are missing the BS1362 plug fuse or the pins are lacking insulating sleeves, among other problems.

Old sockets

Sockets of BS546 are incompatible with BS 1363 plugs. Compliant adaptors are not available to convert a BS546 5Amp socket to a BS 1363 13Amp one.

Solutions

Adaptors
See the page Common electrical adaptors in Hong Kong and the United Kingdom for information about how to use them safely. Some kinds of adaptors widely available in the United Kingdom are not available in Hong Kong. Moreover, the Electrical and Mechanical Services Department discourages the use of some adaptors in Hong Kong.

Power cords
The power cord of your equipment may be replaceable. In this case, new BS 1363 compliant power cords are available in electronic stores.

Plug replacement
It is common for users in the United Kingdom and Hong Kong to wire plugs themselves. In fact, the methodology is included in the physics syllabuses of the Hong Kong Certificate of Education Examination and GCSE.

Plugs and extension cables (BS 1363) sold in the UK and Hong Kong come with instructions on how to wire them safely. They are marked on the extension unit, or in form of a separate sheet.

British standard adaptors are not always available for many kinds of non-UK plugs, including the 3-pin plugs from the mainland China. It is the only option to resolve the plug-and-socket compatibility problem in many cases.

Many books and websites provide information about wiring a UK plug correctly.
Wikibooks
London Fire and Civil Defence Authority 
ESB, Ireland
BBC
diynot.com
PAT-Testing

Wiring update
In Hong Kong, registered electrical contractors are required to carry out any electrical work (e.g. addition to, alteration of, inspection, testing and repair of an electrical installation), including those in connection with a renovation work.
See also Electrical wiring (UK).

See also
BS 1363
Common electrical adaptors in Hong Kong and the United Kingdom
Domestic AC power plugs and sockets
Double insulated
Extension cable
Ground and neutral
Electrical wiring (UK)
Technical standards in colonial Hong Kong

References 

Mains power connectors
Electrical standards
Science and technology in Hong Kong
Electrical wiring
Standards of the People's Republic of China